Dylan Lesko (born September 7, 2003) is an American baseball pitcher in the San Diego Padres organization.

Career
Lesko attended Buford High School in Buford, Georgia. In 2021, he became the first junior to win the Gatorade Baseball Player of the Year after going 11–0 with a 0.35 earned run average (ERA) with 112 strikeouts in 60 innings. He was also named the Gwinnett Daily Post Baseball Pitcher of the Year. During the Summer of 2021 he combined with other pitchers to throw a no-hitter in the Perfect Game All-American Classic at Petco Park.

Lesko was considered the top pitcher available in the 2022 Major League Baseball draft before the season started. He was committed to Vanderbilt University to play college baseball. His season ended when he tore the UCL in his pitching elbow, an injury that required Tommy John surgery, which he underwent on April 26 and is expected to sideline him until 2024. Regardless, the San Diego Padres selected Lesko in the first round, with the 15th overall selection, of the draft. Lesko signed with the Padres for a $3.9m signing bonus, forgoing his commitment to Vanderbilt.

References

External links

2003 births
Living people
Baseball players from Georgia (U.S. state)
Baseball pitchers